Juha Alén (born October 25, 1981) is a Finnish former professional ice hockey player. He played in the SM-liiga for Ilves, Espoo Blues Lukko and Lukko and also played in the American Hockey League for the Cincinnati Mighty Ducks, the Swedish HockeyAllsvenskan for Mora IK and the Austrian Hockey League for Hungarian side Alba Volán Székesfehérvár.  He was drafted 90th overall by the Mighty Ducks of Anaheim in the 2003 NHL Entry Draft.

Career statistics

External links

1981 births
Living people
Ice hockey people from Tampere
Fehérvár AV19 players
Cincinnati Mighty Ducks players
Espoo Blues players
Finnish ice hockey defencemen
HPK players
Ilves players
Lukko players
Anaheim Ducks draft picks
Mora IK players
Rouen HE 76 players
Northern Michigan Wildcats men's ice hockey players
21st-century Finnish people